The Tumen inscription of Kumāragupta is an epigraphic record documenting the construction of a temple in the time of the Gupta king Kumaragupta I. It is dated year 116 in the Gupta era (circa 436 CE).

Location
Tumen (तूमैन, Tumen), also Tumen or Tumbavana (तुंबवन), is a village in Ashoknagar District, Madhya Pradesh, India. The inscription is currently located in the Archaeological Museum, Gwalior.

Publication
The inscription was first published by M. B. Garde in 1918-19. It was subsequently listed by Bhandarkar and M. Willis. An edition with translation was published in Epigraphia Indica in 1941-42. A second edition appeared in the revised edition of Corpus Inscriptionum Indicarum, volume 3, published in 1981.

Description and Contents
The inscription is in the Sanskrit language, engraved in six lines. The prime historical importance of the inscription is its mention of Ghaṭotkacagupta.

Metrics
The metrics are not recorded in the publications consulted.

Text
1) [ri]ryyasya lokattrayānte | caraṇakamalaṃ(la)mattyaṃ(cchaṃ) vandye(ndya)te siddhasaṅdaiḥ(ṅdhaiḥ) [||*] rājā śrī-Candraguptas-tad-anujayate yo medinīṃ sāgarāntām

2) - śrī-Candraguptasya mahendrakalpaḥ kumāraguptas-tanayas-sa[magrām] [|*] rarakṣa sādhvīm iva dharmmapatnīm vairyyāgrahastairupa guhyam bhūmim [||*]

3) [ - - ] gauraḥ kṣityambare guṇasamūhamayūkhajālo nāmnoditassa tu ghaṭotkacaguptacandraḥ [||*] sa pūrvvajānāṃ sthira-satva-kīrttir-bhujārjjitāṃ kīrttim=abhiprapadya ||(|)

4) [guptānvayā*]nāṃ vasudheśvarāṇā[m] samāśate ṣoḍaśavarṣayukte | kumāragupte nṛpatau pri(pṛ)thivyām virājā(ja)māne śaradīva sūryye || vaṭodake sādhujanādhivāse

5) taśśrīdeva ityūrjjitanāmadheyaḥ [||*] tadagrajobhūddharidevasaṃjгastatoёanujo yastu sa dhanyadevaḥ [|*] tatovaro yaśca sa bhadradevastata[‘]kanīyānapi saṅha(ṅgha)deva[ḥ ||*]

6) - nasaktacittāḥ samāna[vṛ]ttākṛti[bhāvadhīrāḥ kṛtā]layā[stu]mbavane ba[bhū]vuḥ || akārayaṃste giri[śri](śṛ)ṅgatuṅgaṃ śaśi[prabhaṃ] devani[ketanaṃ-|]

Translation

See also
Indian inscriptions

Notes

External links
British Museum Research Project : Politics, Ritual and Religion : Epigraphic Findspots
Online version of the Sanskrit text

Sanskrit inscriptions in India
Gupta and post-Gupta inscriptions